Orlando da Costa (born 8 August 1985) is a Brazilian former footballer who played as a midfielder.

Honours
Moghreb Tétouan
Botola: 2011–12

References

1985 births
Living people
Brazilian footballers
Association football midfielders
Botola players
Liga I players
Liga II players
Osasco Futebol Clube players
Union Sidi Kacem players
Moghreb Tétouan players
Kawkab Marrakech players
CS Concordia Chiajna players
Louletano D.C. players
Brazilian expatriate footballers
Expatriate footballers in Morocco
Brazilian expatriate sportspeople in Morocco
Expatriate footballers in Romania
Brazilian expatriate sportspeople in Romania
Expatriate footballers in Portugal
Brazilian expatriate sportspeople in Portugal
Footballers from São Paulo